La sombra del otro (English: Other's Shadow) is a Mexican telenovela produced by Julissa and Giselle González Salgado for Televisa. It premiered on Canal de las Estrellas on May 27, 1996 and ended on Friday, August 16, 1996.

Edith González and Rafael Rojas starred as protagonists, while Alejandro Camacho starred as main antagonist.

Plot 
Pressured by her father, Don Clemente, Lorna Madrigal gets engaged to Iván Lavarta, a renowned psychologist who agrees to the engagement only by gratitude, because when they were children, he saved her from a fire that, unfortunately, killed Lorna's mother, Bernardina del Castillo. Despite the moral engagement, on their wedding day, Lorna decides not to marry Iván.

Cast 
 
Edith González as Lorna Madrigal del Castillo
Rafael Rojas as Manuel de la Riva/Marcos Beltrán
Alejandro Camacho as Dr. Iván Lavarta Morales
Adriana Laffan as Betsy Corcuera de de la Riva
Carlos Bracho as Don Clemente Madrigal
Lilia Aragón as Marina Morales
Blanca Sánchez as Dora "Dorita" Villavicencio Vda. de Rojas/de Madrigal
Pedro Armendáriz, Jr. as Comandante Luis Tello
José Suárez as Alberto Rojas Villavicencio
Dacia González as Camila Corcuera
Luis Couturier as Pierre Tavernier
Marta Aura as Julieta Tavernier
Jorge Antolín as Julián de la Riva
Odiseo Bichir as Dr. Germán Pineda
Manuel Gurría as Fermín Luján
Andrea Legarreta as María Elena "Malena" Gutiérrez
Amairani as Cora Meléndez
Patricio Castillo as Ludwig Brailovsky
Carmelita González as Coco de la Riva
Dolores Beristáin as Concepción "Conchita" de la Riva
Gustavo Negrete as César Corcuera
Adriana Larrañaga as Sonia Escudero
Martha Escobar as Olga Palmerín
Rafael del Villar as Marcos Beltrán
Susana Zabaleta as Lic. Angelina Amaral
Mario del Río as Andrés
Héctor Ortega as Dr. Frank Gluck
Evangelina Sosa as Maley
Yasser Beltrán as Yasser Labrath "El Arabito"
Joana Brito as Consuelo
Mariana Brito as Naty Vidal
Manuela Imaz as Lorna Madrigal (child)
Alan Gutiérrez as Iván Lavarta (child)
Eugenia Leñero as Susy
Luis Rábago as Pancho
Rebeca Mankita as Cristal
Maya Mishalska as Bernardina del Castillo de Madrigal
Tere Mondragón as Marga
Beatriz Monroy as Chayito
Juan Felipe Preciado as Platón
Verónica Langer as Fátima
Baltazar Oviedo as Albañil
Josefo Rodríguez as Dr. Juan Durán
Raúl Valerio as Tiburcio
Alejandro Ávila as Benito
Alicia del Lago as Employee of Tavernier
Fernando Robles as Mario Zamora
Adrián Taboada as Father Palazuelos
Jorge Munguía as Santiago
Martha Navarro
Raquel Pankowsky
Renée Varsi
Ricardo Lezama
Elena Vela
Benito Perculis
Ramón Ramos Arizde

Awards

References

External links

1996 telenovelas
Mexican telenovelas
1996 Mexican television series debuts
1996 Mexican television series endings
Spanish-language telenovelas
Television shows set in Mexico City
Televisa telenovelas